Edgewater, released in 1999, is the first album for the Dallas, Texas based band Edgewater.  The album was recorded independently, and some of its tracks were included on its follow-up, as well as the band's Wind-up debut.

Track listing
All tracks written by Matt Moseman, Adam Leydig, Micah Creel, Cameron Woolf, and Jeremy "Worm" Rees. 
"Exposure"  – 3:55
"Selfish"  – 5:08
"Down Communication"  – 3:51
"Gone By December"  – 3:57
"Squeeze"  – 3:42
"Submerged  – 3:30
"Asteroid"  – 6:43
"Enemy"  – 4:47
"Tres Quatros"  – 5:45
"As If You Know Me"  – 4:17
"Anthem"  – 3:39

Personnel 
Matt Moseman - vocals
Micah Creel - guitar
Cameron Woolf - bass
Jeremy "Worm" Rees - drums

External links
Official Site
Edgewater on MySpace

Edgewater (band) albums
1999 debut albums